James Hargrove may refer to:

 Jim Hargrove (born 1953), member of the Washington State Senate
 James Ward Hargrove (1922–2004), American businessman, United States Postal Service executive and US Ambassador
 Jim Hargrove (American football) (1945–2017), American football linebacker
 Jimmy Hargrove (born 1957), American football running back